Francis Matthey (born 17 July 1942 in Le Locle, Canton of Neuchâtel) is a Swiss politician of the Social Democratic Party of Switzerland (SPS/PSS), best known for declining the election to the Swiss Federal Council on 3 March 1993. Matthey was elected instead of the official candidate of his party, Christiane Brunner. To follow the resolution of the party to enable the election of a woman to the Federal Council, he declined the office. Ruth Dreifuss was finally elected to succeed René Felber.

Matthey was mayor of the city of La Chaux-de-Fonds (1980-1988), member of the Swiss National Council (1987-1995) and member of the Conseil d'Etat of the canton of Neuchâtel (1988-2001).

External links

1942 births
Living people
People from Le Locle
Social Democratic Party of Switzerland politicians
Members of the Council of States (Switzerland)
Members of the National Council (Switzerland)
Mayors of places in Switzerland